Dillon Brooks (born January 22, 1996) is a Canadian professional basketball player for the Memphis Grizzlies of the National Basketball Association (NBA). He played college basketball for the Oregon Ducks, where he was named a consensus second-team All-American and earned conference player of the year honors in the Pac-12 in 2017. He is a member of the Canada national team.

College career
Brooks, a small forward from Mississauga, Ontario, went to the University of Oregon after playing at Findlay Prep in Henderson, Nevada. As a freshman, he averaged 11.5 points per game and was named to the Pac-12 Conference all-freshman team. As a sophomore, Brooks led the Ducks to the Pac-12 Conference regular season title and a top ten national ranking. At the close of the season, he was named first-team All-Pac-12 and a third-team All-American by the Sporting News. He was also named the District IX player of the year by the United States Basketball Writers Association (USBWA). Brooks averaged 16.7 points, 5.4 rebounds, and 3.1 assists per game.

After the conclusion of the 2015–16 season, Brooks said he would remain with Oregon for a third season. He suffered a foot injury in the summer of 2016 and did not play in Oregon's offseason trip to Spain. On November 7, 2016, Brooks was named to the Associated Press' preseason All-America team. During his three seasons of college career Brooks averaged 14.8 points, 4.5 rebounds and 2.6 assists in 28.9 minutes per game.

Shortly after the 2016–17 season, he declared himself eligible for the 2017 NBA draft and hired an agent, ending his college career.

Professional career

Memphis Grizzlies (2017–present)
Brooks was drafted by the Houston Rockets with the 45th pick in the 2017 NBA draft and then was immediately traded to the Memphis Grizzlies. On July 21, 2017, the Grizzlies signed Brooks to his rookie scale contract. On October 18, 2017, during the Grizzlies' season opener, Brooks scored 19 points, the most points scored by a Canadian-born player in an NBA debut.

On April 11, 2018, Brooks scored a career-high 36 points along with seven rebounds, one assist, and two steals in a 137–123 loss against the Oklahoma City Thunder. In December 2018, Brooks was thought to be involved in a failed three-way trade between Memphis, the Washington Wizards and the Phoenix Suns; the trade faltered over confusion between Brooks and his similarly-named teammate, MarShon Brooks, as the Memphis front office did not intend to trade Dillon while the other teams expected him and not MarShon. 

On January 5, 2019, Brooks suffered from a ruptured ligament in his right big toe and underwent a successful surgery to repair it on January 11, 2019. Brooks missed the remainder of the 2018–19 season.

Brooks began the 2019–20 season as the Grizzlies' starting shooting guard. After averaging 16.1 points per game over the first half of the season, on February 5, 2020, he signed a three-year, $35 million extension with the Grizzlies.

On February 28, 2020, Brooks scored a season-high 32 points, along with getting two rebounds, one assist and one block in a 104–101 loss against the Sacramento Kings.

On May 23, 2021, Brooks made his NBA playoff debut, scoring a season-high 31 points, along with 7 rebounds, to help the Grizzlies to a 112–109 Game 1 victory over the top-seeded Utah Jazz. The Grizzlies would go on to get eliminated and lose the series in five games.

On October 12, 2021, it was announced that Brooks would miss two to three weeks due to a fracture in his left hand. On December 19, he scored a career high 37 points in a 105–100 loss to the Portland Trail Blazers. On January 8, 2022, during a 123–108 win over the Los Angeles Clippers, Brooks suffered a left ankle injury. The next day, he was ruled out for 3-to-5 weeks with injury, which was diagnosed as an ankle sprain. On April 16, during Game 1 of the first round of the playoffs, Brooks scored 24 points in a 117–130 loss to the Minnesota Timberwolves.

In Game 2 of the 2022 Western Conference semifinals against the Golden State Warriors, Brooks was assessed a flagrant 2 and ejected after he chased down the Warriors' Gary Payton II and hit him in the head when he was in the air, going up for a fast-break layup; Payton fell hard and fractured his left elbow. Brooks was suspended for Game 3 of the series. The Grizzlies would go on to lose the series in six games.

On February 2, 2023, Brooks was assessed a flagrant 2 foul and ejected for punching Cleveland Cavaliers player Donovan Mitchell in the groin. The next day, the NBA suspended Brooks for one game without pay for his actions. On March 4, he was suspended for one game without pay for incurring his 16th technical foul of the season.

Brooks was fined $35,000 by the NBA after he shoved a cameraman to the floor during a March15, 2023 away game against the Miami Heat.

National team career
On May 24, 2022, Brooks agreed to a three-year commitment to play with the Canadian senior men's national team.

Career statistics

NBA

Regular season

|-
| style="text-align:left;"| 
| style="text-align:left;"| Memphis
| 82 || 74 || 28.7 || .440 || .356 || .747 || 3.1 || 1.6 || .9 || .2 || 11.0
|-
| style="text-align:left;"| 
| style="text-align:left;"| Memphis
| 18 || 0 || 18.3 || .402 || .375 || .733 || 1.7 || .9 || .6 || .2 || 7.5
|-
| style="text-align:left;"| 
| style="text-align:left;"| Memphis
| 73 || 73 || 28.9 || .407 || .358 || .808 || 3.3 || 2.1 || .9 || .4 || 16.2
|-
| style="text-align:left;"| 
| style="text-align:left;"| Memphis
| 67 || 67 || 29.8 || .419 || .344 || .815 || 2.9 || 2.3 || 1.2 || .4 || 17.2
|-
| style="text-align:left;"| 
| style="text-align:left;"| Memphis
| 32 || 31 || 27.7 || .432 || .309 || .849 || 3.2 || 2.8 || 1.1 || .3 || 18.4
|- class="sortbottom"
| style="text-align:center;" colspan="2"| Career
| 272 || 245 || 28.2 || .421 || .348 || .799 || 3.0 || 2.0 || 1.0 || .3 || 14.5

Playoffs

|-
| style="text-align:left;"| 2021
| style="text-align:left;"| Memphis
| 5 || 5 || 35.0 || .515 || .400 || .808 || 4.2 || 2.2 || 1.4 || .4 || 25.8
|-
| style="text-align:left;"| 2022
| style="text-align:left;"| Memphis
| 11 || 11 || 30.5 || .349 || .347 || .640 || 2.7 || 2.7 || 1.0 || .3 || 14.6
|- class="sortbottom"
| style="text-align:center;" colspan="2"| Career
| 16 || 16 || 31.9 || .409 || .359 || .725 || 2.2 || 2.6 || 1.1 || .3 || 18.1

College

|-
| style="text-align:left;"| 2014–15
| style="text-align:left;"| Oregon
| 36 || 33 || 28.3 || .456 || .337 || .825 || 4.9 || 1.8 || .5 || .6 || 11.5
|-
| style="text-align:left;"| 2015–16
| style="text-align:left;"| Oregon
| 38 || 38 || 32.8 || .470 || .338 || .806 || 5.4 || 3.1 || 1.1 || .4 || 16.7
|-
| style="text-align:left;"| 2016–17
| style="text-align:left;"| Oregon
| 35 || 27 || 25.3 || .488 || .401 || .754 || 3.2 || 2.7 || 1.1 || .5 || 16.1
|- class="sortbottom"
| style="text-align:center;" colspan="2"| Career
| 109 || 98 || 28.9 || .472 || .362 || .794 || 4.6 || 2.6 || .9 || .5 || 14.8

National team career
Brooks played for the Canadian national team in the 2015 Pan American Games, where the team won the silver medal.

References

External links

 Oregon Ducks bio
 FIBA profile

1996 births
Living people
All-American college men's basketball players
Basketball people from Ontario
Basketball players at the 2015 Pan American Games
Black Canadian basketball players
Canadian expatriate basketball people in the United States
Findlay Prep alumni
Houston Rockets draft picks
Medalists at the 2015 Pan American Games
Memphis Grizzlies players
National Basketball Association players from Canada
Oregon Ducks men's basketball players
Pan American Games medalists in basketball
Pan American Games silver medalists for Canada
Shooting guards
Small forwards
Sportspeople from Mississauga